Milot is a commune in the Nord department of Haiti, 12 miles south of Cap-Haïtien. It is the site of Sans-Souci Palace, one of Haiti's most revered landmarks. The Citadelle Laferrière, Haiti's best-known landmark, is five miles (8 km) by road to the south. The town also hosts a hospital, Hôpital Sacré Coeur, run by the Sovereign Military Order of Malta and the Crudem Foundation, Inc

Communal Sections 
The commune consists of three communal sections, namely:
 Perches-de-Bonnet, rural
 Bonnet à l'Evêque, urban (town of Milot) and rural
 Genipailler, urban (Carrefour des Pères neighborhood) and rural

External links 

 United Nations Map of Haiti

Populated places in Nord (Haitian department)
Communes of Haiti